Zehra Nigah is an Urdu poet and scriptwriter from Pakistan. She was one of two female poets to gain prominence in the 1950s when the scene was dominated by men. She has written several television drama serials. She has also received various awards including Pride of Performance in recognition of her literary works in 2006. She wrote screenplay of the television serial Umrao Jaan Ada based Mirza Hadi Ruswa's Umrao Jaan Ada.

Personal life

Zehra was born in Hyderabad, British India. She was 10 years old when she and her family migrated to Pakistan after the 1947 partition of India. Her father was a civil servant with an interest in poetry. Zehra's elder sister, Fatima Surayya Bajia, was also a writer. One of her brothers, Anwar Maqsood, is a writer, satirist and a television host and another brother, Ahmad Maqsood was Secretary to the Government of Sindh. Zehra married Majid Ali, who was a civil servant and had interest in Sufi poetry.

Career
Zehra Nigah began her writing career during her childhood. When she was 14 years old, she learned the poetry of prominent poets by heart. She is inspired by classical tradition of Urdu poetry.

Front Line magazine states:

In 2012, an event was held by the fellow writers at the Arts Council of Pakistan, Karachi to launch a CD of Zehra Nigah's poetry in her own voice. The event was presided over by the writer Intizar Hussain and also included the famous humorist Mushtaq Ahmed Yousufi.

Awards and recognition
 She received the Pride of Performance Award from the President of Pakistan in 2006. According to a major newspaper of India, "Zehra Nigah is a much loved and highly respected poet in Pakistan."

Publications
 Shaam Ka Pehla Tara
 Waraq

See also
 List of Pakistani poets
 List of Urdu language poets
 Fatima Surayya Bajia
 Anwar Maqsood
 Zubaida Tariq

References

External links
 ARTICLE: In the jungle of loneliness – DAWN.com
 Zehra Nigah Pays Tribute to Faiz Ahmed Faiz
 Remembering Faiz by Zehra Nigah, The Express Tribune newspaper

1937 births
Living people
Pakistani poets
Urdu-language poets from Pakistan
Pakistani dramatists and playwrights
Recipients of the Pride of Performance
Poets from Karachi
Pakistani women writers
Muhajir people
Pakistani people of Hyderabadi descent
Maqsood family